Hoxwinder Hall is an American comic strip by Daniel Boris, who started the strip while in art school in the 1980s at Art Institute of Pittsburgh.

Characters and Story
Byron Hoxwinder gets much more than he bargains for when he secretly brings a baby alligator home from a family vacation in Florida. Hoxwinder Hall is about two brothers, an unlikely pet alligator named Dozi, and the law of unintended consequences.

The comic strip's main characters:
 Byron Hoxwinder, 10-year-old boy.
 Dozi, the lovable little alligator.
 Rowdy Hoxwinder, Byron's older brother.

Contests and Syndication
Hoxwinder Hall first gained attention when it was selected as a Top 10 finalist in the Washington Post's 2010 "America's Next Great Cartoonist" contest.
The contest judges included Stan Lee, Richard Thompson, and Gene Weingarten. The strip was then voted a Top 5 finalist by the public.

In early 2011, the comic strip was the runner-up in the Cartoonist Studio's "So You Wanna Be A Cartoonist" competition.
As a result of this contest, Boris was awarded a mentorship with syndicated cartoonist Rick Kirkman, co-creator of the very successful syndicated Baby Blues comic strip.

In December 2011, Hoxwinder Hall was signed to a syndication agreement with Ink Bottle Syndicate to print and distribute the comic throughout the U.S. through a weekly newspaper called "Funnies Extra!".

References

External links 
 Hoxwinder Hall
 Ink Bottle Syndicate
 Funnies Extra!
 NBC4 Story
 City Paper Interview with Dan Boris

American comic strips